Nita Mehta is an Indian chef, author, restaurateur and media personality, known for her cookbooks, cooking classes and as a judge on cooking based television shows.

Career

Author
Mehta has authored more than 400 cookbooks of which 6 million copies have been sold worldwide. In 1999, she won the Best Asian Cookbook Award for her book Flavours of Indian Cooking at the World Cookbook Fair in Paris. Her other notable books include Indian Cooking With Olive Oil, Vegetarian Chinese, Zero Oil Cooking, Diabetes Delicacies, 101 Recipes for Children, and The Best of Chicken and Paneer.

Entrepreneurship
Mehta runs a culinary academy known as Nita Mehta Culinary Academy in New Delhi, started in 2001. Apart from the original campus set up by Mehta, the academy runs on a franchise model. Courses include those for fast food, traditional Indian meals, picnic packs, "low-calorie snacks", salads, desserts, chocolates, confectionery as well as "healthy heart" recipes. 

In 2012, Mehta turned restaurateur with the launch of her restaurant Kelong at Sarabha Nagar in Ludhiana.

Celebrity appearances
Several banks have chosen Nita Mehta's cooking classes among other events of interest to women to disseminate information related to personal finance, based on a Reserve Bank of India directive in 2004. Panasonic organised an event in Coimbatore in 2004 where Nita Mehta was invited to share recipes for microwave cooking to promote the same. In 2007, Kurkure, a brand of ready-to-eat snacks owned by PepsiCo ran a recipe contest which was judged by Nita Mehta. In 2010, Mehta and Hamdard Laboratories created mocktail and dessert recipes for Rooh Afza which were used in a new marketing campaign. Also in 2010, Step by Step a school in Panchsheel Colony, New Delhi consulted Mehta who provided a menu which was handed over to parents as a guide to food which should be packed for students going to the school. Nita Mehta has judged several cooking contests, such as Mallika-e-Kitchen 2011 which culminated at JW Marriott in Chandigarh. Later in 2011, Mehta appeared on the television cooking contest MasterChef India as a judge.

Awards
 Best Asian Cookbook Award for Flavours of Indian Cooking at the World Cookbook Fair in Paris (1999)

References

External links
 Official website

Living people
Indian food writers
Indian chefs
Chefs of Indian cuisine
Women cookbook writers
Women food writers
Year of birth missing (living people)